Suprobhat Bangladesh (Bengali: সুপ্রভাত বাংলাদেশ Suprobhat Bangladesh "Good Morning Bangladesh") is a regional daily newspaper in Bangladesh, published from Chittagong in the Bengali language. Rusho Mahmud has been the editor of the newspaper since its founding.

Supplements
 দেউড়ি Dewri ("Dewri"): Daily Lifestyle & Entertainment supplement
 রাজনীতি Rajneeti ("Politics"): Saturday featured supplement
 শিল্পসাহিত্য Shilpashahitya ("Art and literature"): Friday featured supplement on art and literature
 সুপ্রভাত সুহৃদ Supribhat Suhrid ("Good Morning friend"): Sunday featured supplement

See also
 List of newspapers in Bangladesh

References

Bengali-language newspapers published in Bangladesh
Newspapers published in Chittagong
Daily newspapers published in Bangladesh